Daviesia pauciflora is a species of flowering plant in the family Fabaceae and is endemic to the south of Western Australia. It is an open shrub with many stems, flattened, linear phyllodes, and mostly yellow flowers with red, orange and dull brownish markings.

Description

Taxonomy and naming
Daviesia pauciflora was first formally described in 1995 by Michael Crisp in Australian Systematic Botany from specimens collected by Anthony Orchard near Esperance in 1968. The specific epithet (pauciflora) means "few-flowered".

Distribution and habitat
This daviesia grows in tall, dense heath from near Munglinup to Esperance in the Esperance Plains and Mallee biogeographic regions in the south of Western Australia.

Conservation status
Daviesia pauciflora is listed as "Priority Three" by the Government of Western Australia Department of Biodiversity, Conservation and Attractions, meaning that it is poorly known and known from only a few locations but is not under imminent threat.

References

pauciflora
Eudicots of Western Australia
Plants described in 1991
Taxa named by Michael Crisp